The CPJ International Press Freedom Awards honor journalists or their publications around the world who show courage in defending press freedom despite facing attacks, threats, or imprisonment. Established in 1991, the awards are administered by the Committee to Protect Journalists (CPJ), an independent, non-governmental organization based in New York City. In addition to recognizing individuals, the organization seeks to focus local and international media coverage on countries where violations of press freedom are particularly serious.

Every November four to seven individuals or publications are honored at a banquet in New York City and given an award. The ceremony also honors the winner of the Burton Benjamin Memorial Award for "lifelong work to advance press freedom". Past hosts have included crime correspondent and former hostage Terry A. Anderson, Amanpour host Christiane Amanpour, and NBC Nightly News anchors Brian Williams and Tom Brokaw. In 1998, the ceremony was briefly disrupted by protesters who unfurled a banner calling for the release of former Black Panther Mumia Abu-Jamal from Pennsylvania's death row.

History
The first awards were given in 1991 to American photojournalist Bill Foley and his wife, journalist Cary Vaughan; Cameroonian reporter Pius Njawé; Chinese dissidents Wang Juntao and Chen Ziming; Russian television news anchor Tatyana Mitkova; and Guatemalan reporter Byron Barrera. In 2014, the organization awarded its twenty-fourth group of journalists. On three occasions, an award was also given to a news organization of which multiple staffers have been at risk: Tajikistan newspaper Navidi Vakhsh (1994), several reporters of which murdered during the 1992–97 civil war; Guatemalan newspaper Siglo Veintiuno (1995), which was subject to police and army raids for its uncensored coverage of government corruption and human rights violations; and Turkish newspaper Özgür Gündem (1996), which was subject to a campaign of publication bans, assassinations, and arrests for its reporting on the conflict between the Turkish Armed Forces and the Kurdistan Workers' Party.

Occasionally, imprisoned laureates accept their awards at a later ceremony, such as China's Jiang Weiping, who was awarded in 2001 but attended the ceremony in 2009, and Azerbaijan's Eynulla Fatullayev, who was awarded in 2009 but attended the ceremony in 2011. Sri Lankan reporter J. S. Tissainayagam was also awarded in 2009 while imprisoned, but was released in time to attend the 2010 ceremony, quipping in his acceptance speech, "Ladies and gentlemen, my apologies for being late."

The award was given posthumously on three occasions: to David Kaplan, an ABC News producer killed by a sniper in Sarajevo in 1992; to Paul Klebnikov, a Russian Forbes journalist shot to death in 2004 by unknown attackers; and to Atwar Bahjat, an Iraqi journalist for Al Arabiya who was abducted and murdered in February 2006. A number of other laureates had been threatened or attacked in the year preceding their award, such as Guatemalan journalist Byron Barrera (1991), whose wife was murdered in an attack on their car, and Željko Kopanja (2000), who lost his legs in a car bomb. Other laureates have been killed after their awards, such as Irish crime reporter Veronica Guerin (1995), awarded a year before her murder, and Palestinian cameraman Mazen Dana (1991), awarded two years before being fatally shot by a US soldier in Iraq. Eritrean journalist Fesshaye Yohannes (2002) died while still imprisoned; owing to conflicting reports and the secrecy of his confinement, the cause and year of his death remain unclear.

Recipients
This list includes the recipients of the award as recorded at the official CPJ website. It is sortable by year, name, and country; owing to naming conventions in different countries, not all names are sorted by last name. Names in italics are publications which have received the award.

References

External links

 

Awards established in 1991
Free expression awards
American journalism awards
1991 establishments in New York City